Eudolium crosseanum is a species of large sea snail, a marine gastropod mollusk in the family Tonnidae, the tun shells.

Distribution
Barbados.

Description

The maximum recorded shell length is 81 mm.

Habitat
Minimum recorded depth is 17 m. Maximum recorded depth is 914 m.

References

External links

Tonnidae
Gastropods described in 1869